KOKY is a commercial radio station broadcasting from Little Rock, Arkansas (licensed to suburban Sherwood) on 102.1 FM.  It airs an Urban Adult Contemporary format, and is owned and operated by The Last Bastion Station Trust, LLC.  The station's studios are located in West Little Rock (in the same facility with its former sister stations now owned by Cumulus Media), and the transmitter tower is located west of the downtown area.

History
The original KOKY, at 1440 AM, existed as a longtime heritage urban station in Little Rock from its launch in 1956.  It was the first station aimed at the African American community in Arkansas.  Then located near Central High, one of its alumni, Al Bell, was influenced by the station during the heyday of the Civil Rights Movement.   He later became head of Stax Records.  That KOKY changed its call letters to KITA and switched to gospel music in 1979; it is now KTUV, a Latino station.  The call letters were also reused in the 1980s on the 1250 AM frequency, now KFOG (AM).

KOUN signed on at 102.1 FM in 1994, playing classic rock. The call letters were changed to LPQ in 1994.

The present KOKY was launched by Citadel Broadcasting on January 1, 1998, per its FCC filings.  From the beginning, it has claimed the original KOKY as its inspiration and heritage; its website's history refers only to the original KOKY, and does not mention that its only connections to the 1440 AM station are the call letters and general format.  Its logo was derived from the 1250 AM KOKY, which was owned by a Little Rock predecessor of Citadel; KPZK (AM) is still owned by Citadel.

In 2007, upon merger of nearly a couple dozen ABC Radio stations, Citadel relinquished 11 of its radio stations, including former sister stations KARN-FM & KVLO and current sister station KPZK-FM (which KVLO simulcast till it was sold in 2012), to The Last Bastion Station Trust, LLC.  However, the trust decided it would not simulcast KARN, which had remained with Citadel, on KARN-FM; Citadel then transferred KOKY to the trust in exchange for KARN-FM.  The choice of KOKY was probably made to increase the likelihood that both KOKY and KPZK-FM, which also targets an African American audience, would be sold together to an African American owner; the FCC order that required the divestitures to Last Bastion strongly suggested that the trust seek out minority owners.

Today the station's main competition is from its former sister station KIPR (its former sister station, now owned by Cumulus - which purchased Citadel), and which KPZK (AM) now simulcasts.  KOKY was the market's home to nationally syndicated: The Tom Joyner Morning Show. As of January 1, 2020  it is now home to nationally syndicated: The Rickey Smiley Morning Show.

References

External links
 Official Website

OKY
Urban adult contemporary radio stations in the United States
Sherwood, Arkansas